Coleophora ignotella is a moth of the family Coleophoridae. It is found in Spain.

References

ignotella
Moths described in 1944
Moths of Europe